Sir Luke William Burke Teeling (5 February 1903 – 26 October 1975) was an Irish writer, traveller and a Member of Parliament (MP in the United Kingdom). He was known for his enthusiasm for a Channel Tunnel.

Background
Born in Dublin to a prominent Roman Catholic family, he was the son of the Accountant-General of the Irish Supreme Court. One of his great-granduncles, Bartholomew Teeling, was hanged by the British for taking part in the Irish Rebellion of 1798. He attended the London Oratory School and Magdalen College, Oxford, where he studied history.

Journalistic and literary career

On leaving university, Teeling became a journalist and travelled widely both at home and abroad, especially in the United States where he described himself as an "amateur tramp". He lived among the homeless and hitched lifts on freight trains, reporting back to The Times about his adventures. 

In the early 1930s he studied the youth movements in Nazi Germany. In winter 1933 Teeling had walked all the way from London to Newcastle upon Tyne, sleeping in hostels and examining the efforts of local councils to tackle unemployment.

Another preoccupation when Teeling was travelling abroad was the treatment given to Irish immigrants and to the Catholic Church. In 1937, he wrote The Pope in Politics (expressively dedicated "to those Catholics who have faith in the future of democracy"), which suggested that Pope Pius XI was opposed to the new forms of Catholicism developing in the Americas and also pointed out the Pope's autocratic views and his complicity with Fascist Italy. 

He followed this in 1939 with Crisis for Christianity, a book which dealt with the relations between the Catholic Church and Nazism.

Parliamentary career

When the Second World War broke out, Teeling joined the Royal Air Force. Having already fought the safe Labour seat of West Ham Silvertown in the 1929 general election, Teeling was elected to Parliament as a Conservative for Brighton in the 1944 Brighton by-election. This was a two-member seat, and Teeling was re-elected in the 1945 general election. The seat was divided into two individual constituencies thereafter, and Teeling was chosen for Brighton Pavilion.

Throughout his Parliamentary career Teeling remained on the backbenches and maintained a close comradery relationship with Sir Winston Churchill.
A keen Orientalist and collector, his expertise on foreign affairs was well acknowledged amongst his peers, (he was a Freeman of Seoul in Korea). He was also a strong supporter of The Republic of China (Taiwan) and a friend of Madame Chiang Kai-Shek. The President of The Republic, Chiang Kai-Shek, presented Dr. Teeling with the Gin-Shin Medal (Order of the Brilliant Star) on 29 November 1959 for his "Achievements and Contributions" to the Republic of China. He maintained a residence near Keelung on the Island of Taiwan and received many gifts from Madame Chang Kai-Shek, including many modest Chinese and Japanese works of art, as she and her friends decorated his home there.

Together with his private secretary, Vera Kaspar, he was a long time supporter of the attempts to build a tunnel under the English Channel, and chaired an all-party committee which campaigned for it. He was also Secretary of the All-Party committee on holiday resorts.

He was knighted in 1962. By 9 July 1968 he was a Member of the Conservative Monday Club and is mentioned as one of the MPs who signed a House of Commons Order Paper (no.151) calling for the government to "exclude all questions of sovereignty over the Falkland Islands from any talks they are having with the Argentine Government".

Later life

Teeling resigned in February 1969, owing to ill health. He maintained a Grace and Favour residence in St James', London, and travelled to Africa to help his recovery. He became secretary of the Irish Peers Association in June 1970, whose cause he had often promoted. He bequeathed much of his collection of oriental objects d'art to his private secretary, Vera Kaspar.

References

 Obituary, The Times, 28 October 1975
 M. Stenton and S. Lees, Who's Who of British MPs, Harvester Press, 1981

External links 
 

1903 births
1975 deaths
Alumni of Magdalen College, Oxford
Conservative Party (UK) MPs for English constituencies
Writers from Dublin (city)
Catholic Unionists
Politicians from Dublin (city)
Royal Air Force officers
UK MPs 1935–1945
UK MPs 1945–1950
UK MPs 1950–1951
UK MPs 1951–1955
UK MPs 1955–1959
UK MPs 1959–1964
UK MPs 1964–1966
UK MPs 1966–1970
Channel Tunnel
Knights Bachelor